Carroll Phillips (born September 2, 1992) is an American football defensive end who is a free agent. He played college football at Illinois.

Professional career

Jacksonville Jaguars
Phillips signed with the Jacksonville Jaguars as an undrafted free agent on May 1, 2017. He was waived by the Jaguars on September 2, 2017 and was signed to the practice squad the next day. He was promoted to the active roster on December 2, 2017.

On September 1, 2018, Phillips was waived by the Jaguars.

Indianapolis Colts
On September 3, 2018, Phillips was signed to the Indianapolis Colts' practice squad. He was promoted to the active roster on September 28, 2018. He was placed on injured reserve on November 13, 2018 with a groin injury.

On August 31, 2019, Phillips was waived by the Colts.

Washington Redskins
On October 30, 2019, Phillips was signed to the Washington Redskins practice squad. He was promoted to the active roster on November 19, 2019. He was waived on November 30.

Atlanta Falcons
On December 18, 2019, Phillips was signed to the Atlanta Falcons practice squad. His practice squad contract with the team expired on January 6, 2020.

Philadelphia Stars
Phillips was selected with the sixth pick of the fourth round of the 2022 USFL Draft by the Philadelphia Stars. He was transferred to the team's inactive roster on May 5, 2022, with lumbar neuropathy. He was released on May 10.

References

External links
Illinois Fighting Illini bio

1992 births
Living people
Players of American football from Miami
Miami Central Senior High School alumni
American football defensive ends
Illinois Fighting Illini football players
Jacksonville Jaguars players
Indianapolis Colts players
Washington Redskins players
Atlanta Falcons players
The Spring League players
Philadelphia Stars (2022) players